Chalk It Up is a 2016 American gymnastics film directed by former gymnast Hisonni Johnson. The film stars Maddy Curley, John DeLuca, Nikki SooHoo, Drew Seeley, Julie Warner, and Thomas Fowler.

SooHoo, Warner, Paige, and Curley had previously co-starred in Stick It; the two films are not connected, although both deal with competitive gymnastics.

Plot 
Apple, a student at the prestigious Greene University, has a business editing other students' papers. Her main goal is to marry her rugby-playing, idiotic boyfriend Todd. However, the rugby team is disbanded because of the Title IX rule, and Todd transfers to another school. Apple decides to start a women's gymnastics team so that he can stay. She and her roommate Cali, an intense but very sweet girl, find six athletic girls at Greene. She also meets Chet, another rugby player and the TA for her economics class. The athletics director eventually approves the gymnastics team. With Cali as their coach, the team starts to learn gymnastics. Apple and Chet grow closer, and he kisses her.

The rugby team is allowed to compete again. Todd returns to campus, makes Apple fold his clothes and then dumps her. Heartbroken, she quits the gymnastics team and starts spending her time going on dates. Without her, the team disbands, and her friends, including Chet and Cali, stop talking to her. Then, the school's dean finds out about Apple's paper-editing business. Apple has a hearing where she is accused of violating Greene University's academic policy. During the hearing, she realizes what the team meant to her, and the case is dismissed. She apologizes to her friends, and the gymnastics team is re-formed for the last competition of the season. Each gymnast improves with practice, and at the meet, they do well and hit all of their routines. Apple ends the competition by scoring a perfect 10 on floor exercise. Chet meets her afterwards, and the two kiss.

Cast 
 Maddy Curley as Apple
 John DeLuca as Chet
 Nikki SooHoo as Cali
 Drew Seeley as Todd
 Julie Warner as Dean York
 Thomas Fowler as Preston Kelly
 Nicholas Gonzalez as CIA Interviewer
 Tarah Paige as Emily
 Rachele Brooke Smith as Angelina
 Svetlana Boginskaya as Coach Baryshova
 Molly Gardner as Tanya
 Krista Jasper as Cashew
 Jenny Hansen as Becky
 Brittnee Habbib as Courtney
 Meghan Victoria Martin as Penny
 Cecile Garcia as Skylar

Production 
Principal photography began on September 3, 2014. The film was shot in 12 days.

Release 
The movie was made available for pre-ordering from August 25, 2016 on iTunes. It was released on iTunes, Amazon and Google Play on September 13, 2016.

References

External links 
 

2016 films
2010s sports comedy films
American sports comedy films
Gymnastics films
2016 comedy films
2010s English-language films
2010s American films